This is a list of richest monarchs and family members, as estimated by the CEOWORLD magazine in 2019 and Business Insider in 2018, by their personal net worth, excluding properties held by the state, government or Crown, in U.S. dollars.

See also
 List of wealthiest families

References

Lists of royalty
Royals
Richest